Al-Shami Hospital is a central hospital in Al-Malky street, Damascus, Syria.

References

Buildings and structures in Damascus
Hospitals in Syria